The Time Zones Exchange Project distills selections from Negativland's radio program Over the Edge, broadcast on KPFA.  This CD was edited together from several different broadcasts recorded between 1989 and 1992. A 1988 edition, radically different from the CD version, is online at Over the Edge at archive.org.

Unlike previous volumes of the Over The Edge series, this two disc set presents a rambling documentary with a pseudo-plot to uncover information about the elusive Trillionaire C.E. Friday, a character that recurs throughout various forms of Negativland Media, and also covers many theories about Howland Island.  Disc 1 contains a mock radio show, The Piddle Diddle Report - from a network called the American Broadcasting System, a rival to the Universal Media Netweb - which closely parodies the Art Bell show.  Disc 2 is presented as a Universal Media Netweb simulcast, in conjunction with Radio Moscow, to teach the people of Russia the basics of a Free Market economy.  Throughout this disc are commercials for Mertz, a Decision-Enhancing Mental Supplement, and a series of recordings from a real botched attempt to do a similar simulcast in the mid 1980s.  This album was released in 1994 on Negativland's Seeland label.

Track listing
PART ONE: TIME ZONES EXCHANGE PROJECT 68:47
"Executive Window, Memo to Friday, Memo from the Future, Dickie Diamond and the Media Shifter"  – 11:38
"The Piddle Diddle Report: Sandamanians, Transinfiltration, Nothing is Too Wonderful to be True"  – 8:12
"The Piddle Diddle Report: Human Values, Where is Friday?, A Call from Howland Island and the President"  – 6:41
"The Piddle Diddle Report: Strike It Rich, This Fabled Island, Cary Grant Tapes a Ghost"  – 18:32
"The Piddle Diddle Report: After the Rain, Let's Take a Few Calls, Photos of Mrs. Gorbachev, Computercoup, Atom Spy"  – 8:46
"The Piddle Diddle Report: Sergio Caracus, Frankenstein Meets Cyclops, What Was On The Island?, Who Was On The Island?, Agoraphobia"  – 7:27
"The Piddle Diddle Report: A Future Confronting the Past which is Our Future, Last Call from Howland Island, Eaten by a Black Hole, Returned to your Rightful Channel"  – 7:31
PART TWO: TESTWAVE 72:10'
"A Unique Cultural Simulcast, Cubulax Guidelines, Dickie Diamond Grabs the Gusto, Russian National Anthem, Take Me Out to the Ball Game"  – 8:13
"Americo-Soviet Free Market Osmosis, Mertz, Intercontinental Phone Mess"  – 7:29
"Russian Factoids, Natural Woman, Toilet Paper"  – 4:48
"Ads and Smiles, Hey You-Buy This!, Innovation, Shilling for Attention"  – 8:08
"Mertz, A Force of Nature, Hard and Soft Thinking, The Good Life, Cars"  – 6:59
"One Bar of Soap, Rubles, Mertz, It's As If We Never Left Home, Negativ Thoughts, Nuts-Oh Nuts!, You Will Be Rearranged"   – 9:47
"Passage To The 9th Dimension, Memo to Howland, Calling Radio Moscow"  – 5:19
"A Presidential Campaign Shortwave Broadcast by C. Eliot Friday"  – 2:40
"The Piddle Diddle Report: What's to Come, The Quantum Edge, Fiber Optics, Experimental Sharpness'  – 9:15
"A Place in Time To Put Time In Its Place, Do You Have a Job?, Das Vedanya, Mertz, Credits, So What Was I Looking For?"  – 9:32

Negativland albums
1994 compilation albums